See also 1698 in piracy, 1700 in piracy, and Timeline of piracy.

Events

Indian Ocean 

 April - John Bowen and George Booth capture the slave ship Speaker near Mahajanga.
 September - Robert Culliford, Dirk Chivers, and several others, after being trapped by British vessels at St. Mary's Island, accept pardons from Thomas Warren.

North America
Late April - Dutch pirate Hendrick van Hoven captures the 22-gun vessel Providence near Barbados. John James, a Welsh sailor aboard Providence before it was captured, mutinies with other members of the crew and becomes captain of the ship after marooning van Hoven on islands near Nassau.
July 6 - William Kidd is arrested for piracy in New York, on the orders of Lord Governor Bellomont.
July 27 - John James ransacks the sloop Roanoke Merchant.
September 26 - Thomas Paine is first interrogated by authorities about William Kidd's fortune, claiming that it is not in his house.

Births

 Thomas Sutton

Deaths

 William Burke
 Dirk Chivers

References

Piracy
Piracy by year